Ek Se Bhale Do is a 1985 Indian Bollywood film directed by S. V. Rajendra Singh Babu. It stars Shammi Kapoor, Kumar Gaurav, Rati Agnihotri, Sharmila Tagore, Amjad Khan in pivotal roles. The title "Ek Se Bhale Do" is a Hindi phrase that translates as "two is better than one".

Plot
David D'Mello (Parikshat Sahni) lives a middle-classed lifestyle in Bangalore along with his wife, Mary (Sharmila Tagore) and a son, Bunty and is a jockey in the Bangalore Turf Club. He has a run-in with a wealthy stud farm owner, Gomango (Ranjeet), who kills him. David's death also kills his widower friend, Balram (Amjad Khan), compelling his son, Bheema, to move in with Mary.

She gives birth to a daughter and makes a living sewing and stitching clothes, while Bunty and Bheema wash cars and do small chores. Years later both Bheema (also Amjad Khan) and Bunty (Kumar Gaurav) have grown up, work on a stud farm, and look after a pony, Sikander. Bunty is in love with Jenny (Rati Agnihotri) and wants to marry her, but her dad, William (Shammi Kapoor), will only give his blessings after Bunty accumulates some wealth.

In order to get wealthy quickly both Bheema and Bunty decide to rob Gomango and set off a chain of events that will endanger and change their lives forever.

Cast
 Shammi Kapoor as William
 Kumar Gaurav as Bunty D'Mello 
 Rati Agnihotri as Jenny
 Sharmila Tagore as Mary D'Mello 
 Parikshit Sahni as David D'Mello 
 Amjad Khan as Balram / Bheema (Double Role)
 Ranjeet as Gomango

Soundtrack
Lyrics: Anjaan

External links

 Cult of Kumar

1980s Hindi-language films
1985 films
Films scored by R. D. Burman
Films directed by Rajendra Singh Babu